Mikhail Shibanov was a Russian painter active during the 1780s; a portrait of Count Alexander Dmitriev-Mamonov of which he is known to be the author dates to about this time.  Shibanov was a serf of Prince Grigory Potemkin; his date of birth is unknown.  Two of his genre scenes are held at the Tretyakov Gallery in Moscow; the above-mentioned portrait is in the Russian Museum now.

Shibanov died sometime after 1798.

References
 

Year of birth missing
1790s deaths
18th-century painters from the Russian Empire
Russian male painters
Russian serfs